is a village in Erdemli district of Mersin Province, Turkey. It is  situated to the east of Alata creek valley. The main economic activity is agriculture, and various vegetables are produced.

References

Villages in Erdemli District